Herbert Claude Barnard (16 October 18906 December 1957) was an Australian politician. He was a member of the Australian Labor Party (ALP) and represented the Division of Bass in federal parliament from 1934 to 1949. He served as Minister for Repatriation in the Chifley Government from 1946 to 1949. His son Lance Barnard also entered federal politics and served as Deputy Prime Minister of Australia in the 1970s.

Early life
Barnard was born at Mole Creek, Tasmania and was educated at Invermay State School, but left school at 14.  In 1909 he began working for Tasmanian Government Railways, first as an engine cleaner and eventually as a driver.  In March 1912 he married Martha Melva McKenzie and they raised three sons and a daughter in East Launceston.  In 1920 he helped found the Australian Federated Union of Locomotive Enginemen.

Federal politics
Barnard stood unsuccessfully at the 1931 election as the Australian Labor Party candidate for the seat of Bass in the Australian House of Representatives.  In 1933, he became state secretary of the party and at the 1934 election he won Bass.  From 1941 to 1946, he was chairman of the joint parliamentary committee on social security, which developed much of the Curtin and Chifley governments' social policy agenda.  In November 1946, he was appointed Minister for Repatriation in the second Chifley Ministry. Although one of his sons was killed in the war and the other two were injured, he was under constant attack from service organisations and others for not delivering more for war veterans and, like his predecessor, Charles Frost, in 1946, he lost his seat at the 1949 election.

Later life
In 1950, Barnard was elected to represent the Tasmanian House of Assembly division of Bass and held it until his death in 1957.  He died of cancer in Launceston Public Hospital, survived by his wife and two sons, one of whom, Lance Barnard, was Deputy Prime Minister of Australia 1972–74.

References

 

Australian Labor Party members of the Parliament of Australia
Members of the Australian House of Representatives
Members of the Australian House of Representatives for Bass
Members of the Cabinet of Australia
Members of the Tasmanian House of Assembly
Australian trade unionists
1890 births
1957 deaths
20th-century Australian politicians
Train drivers